Choate, Texas is an unincorporated community in Karnes County, Texas, approximately 10 miles from Kenedy.

Towns in Texas
Geography of Karnes County, Texas